Willpower: Rediscovering the Greatest Human Strength is a book about self-control, co-authored by Roy Baumeister, professor of psychology at Florida State University, and New York Times journalist John Tierney. The book outlines Baumeister's research on ego depletion, surveys why people do not have effective self-control and outlines techniques for improving one's self-control.

References

2011 non-fiction books
Popular psychology books
Self-help books
Self-control
Penguin Press books